LaNeah Menzies (born May 27, 1988), better known by her stage name Starshell, is an American actress, songwriter, social entrepreneur and recording artist.

Life and career
Menzies was born to African-American and Brazilian parents and was raised in Lowell, Massachusetts.

Menzies began her career as a child actress and model. As a teenager, she pursued her music career and, soon after college, signed to Universal Music Group's Interscope Records Matriarch Record company. She co-penned "Love Lockdown" for pop superstar Kanye West, which debuted at number three on the U.S. Billboard Hot 100 and went on to sell over three million copies. In 2009, she co-penned "I Can See in Color" and "Closer" for Mary J. Blige. The former was featured in the Oscar-nominated film, Precious, while the latter is featured on Blige's album, Stronger with Each Tear. 
Menzies's first single, "Superluva", produced by Fernando Garibay and written by Menzies and Nire Alldai, was released in the summer of 2010. The single was followed by a retro-pop remix version produced by DJ Cassidy, entitled "Superluva" (Cass & Dubs Remix).

In the summer of 2012, Menzies toured with Jennifer Lopez and Enrique Iglesias on their Dance Again World Tour, as well as on Mary J. Blige and D'Angelo's Liberation Tour with her second single, and pop hit, "Birthday Girl". Birthday Girl debuted via iTunes on February 7, 2012. Menzies's clothing line, Birthday Girl, consisting of a wide range of basics and was launched in 2013 with the help of Kickstarter. She also appeared in Law and Order: Special Victims Unit, Season 14, Episode 16: 'Funny Valentine' in February 2013.

Starshell is the trademark owner of Birthday Girl and launched Birthday Girl World tech platform in 2016. Birthday Girl raised $1 million in seed funding in 2018.

Causes
In June 2013, Menzies partnered with the American Foundation for Suicide Prevention (AFSP) to raise awareness about suicide and suicide prevention. She was announced as the national spokesperson for the Foundation at AFSP's annual Overnight Walk. She released a song with the campaign, "My Star," co-penned by Ne-Yo in tribute to her deceased sister who had also committed suicide.

Discography

Singles

Film

References

American women singer-songwriters
American singer-songwriters
Living people
Suicide prevention
Mary J. Blige
1988 births
21st-century American singers
21st-century American women singers